C24 Gallery is a contemporary art gallery located on West 24th Street in Chelsea, New York City. The gallery was founded in 2011 by Emre and Maide Kurttepeli and partners, Mel Dogan, and Asli Soyak. David C. Terry is the gallery’s director and curator. C24 Gallery presents solo and group exhibitions of both local and international artists. In addition to its exhibition program, which includes collaborations with cultural institutions such as the Elizabeth Foundation for the Arts, Field Projects, Berlin-based A:D: Curatorial and the UK-based ING Discerning Eye Exhibition, C24 Gallery regularly hosts panel discussions, performances and other events, and participates in major art fairs globally. With its increasingly diverse program, the Gallery is focusing on more underrepresented artists and voices from a wide variety of communities.

Artists 
Artists exhibited by C24 Gallery are also featured in museum exhibitions and biennials, and are included in leading institutional collections. Artists represented by C24 Gallery are Marion Fink, Cheryl Molnar, Irfan Önürmen, Viktor Popović, Christian Vincent, Regina Scully, and Marie Tomanova.  

In addition to the artists they represent, C24 Gallery has organized exhibitions featuring works by local and internationally based artists including Jane Corrigan, Mike Dargas, Liana Fink, Karen Finley, Skylar Fein, Nilbar Güreş, Tommy Hartung, Dil Hildebrand, Deborah Kass, Jane Kaplowitz, Ali Kazma, Pixy Liao, Katja Loher, Sven Marquardt, Adele Mills, Ekaterina Panikanova, Seçkin Pirim, Carl Pope, Brian Tolle, and Domingo Zapata.

Exhibitions 

C24 Gallery's first exhibition, Double Crescent: Art From Istanbul And New Orleans, was curated by Dan Cameron, one-time director of the Istanbul Biennial and former senior curator of the New Museum. According to Cameron, the show's goal was to “examine the art of two great port cities that have channeled European culture into unexpected colors and shapes.” The show featured the work of New Orleans art collective Generic Art Solutions and Turkish artists Hale Tenger and Ali Kazma.

In January 2012 C24 Gallery presented their group show Campaign curated by Aldrich Contemporary Art Museum curator and former P.S.1 Contemporary Art Center / Museum of Modern Art curator Amy Smith-Stewart. Featuring the work of 27 artists including Jen DeNike, Kate Gilmore, K8 Hardy, Adam Helms, Aleksandra Mir, and Hank Willis Thomas. Campaign revealed how women's bodies have been distorted and exploited for commercial purposes, and used repurposed imagery from fashion, advertising, entertainment and tabloid culture to create alternative meanings, thereby revealing the hidden messages latent beneath digitally altered beings. In Artforum, critic Johanna Fateman, highlighted Kathe Burkhart's Liz Taylor paintings as "a perverse homage to misogynist projection. In Beaver: From the Liz Taylor Series, a deck of strip-poker playing cards silhouette the flatly painted Hollywood icon, and a shaggy length of fake fur, affixed as Taylor’s stole, underscores the obscenity of the red text that bisects the canvas like a protest sign: BEAVER."

With the addition of Terry as director in 2018, C24 gallery has a seasoned curator and cultural producer with a history of supporting internationally emerging, mid-career, and established artists. The first exhibition Terry curated as director was Core Sample, featuring works by a diverse range of artists from the United States, Switzerland, and Turkey. Prior to joining the gallery, Terry curated the exhibition Facial Profiling in 2017. 

Additional notable exhibitions at C24 Gallery include Split Archives, a solo exhibition of work by Viktor Popovic; Transfigured with artists Jaishri Abichandani, Gabriel Barcia-Colombo, Andrea Dezso, and Sophie Kahn; Bust-Head; Word Up! co-curated with Sharon Louden, including work by Liana Fink, Karen Finley, Deborah Kass, Carl Pope, and other artists who incorporate text and written language in their artwork; Pool Party co-curated with Field Projects; Culture Keepers; Analogous Dimensions co-curated with AD: Curatorial; You Belong Here, a two-person show featuring Orit Ben Shitrit and Nirit Takele; The Seventh View, featuring selections from the ING Discerning Eye Exhibition; On the Inside: Portraiture Through Photography with artists Lisa Crafts, Laura Heyman, Pixy Liao, Sven Marquardt, and Marie Tomanova; Sites Unseen, a solo exhibition of collage-paintings by Cheryl Molnar; and Earthen Delights with works by Hinrich Kroger, Steven Montgomery, and Brendan Lee Satish Tang.

C24 Gallery presented R.U.R. (Rossum’s Universal Robots), an installation by Tommy Hartung at VOLTA art fair in 2018; and an exhibition of works by Viktor Popović at the 2020 Armory Show in New York, which juxtapose archival images of the Croatian Coast prior to the Croatian War of Independence with contemporary photographs revealing the social, cultural, and economic effects of war.

References

External links 
 

Art museums and galleries in Manhattan
2011 establishments in New York City
Chelsea, Manhattan
Art galleries established in 2011
Contemporary art galleries in the United States